Bautek  is a German aircraft manufacturer based in Kenn. The company specializes in hang gliders and ultralight trikes.

In 2009 the company branched out from producing hang gliders and constructed their first trike design, the Bautek Skycruiser.

Aircraft

References

External links

Aircraft manufacturers of Germany
Hang gliders
Ultralight trikes